The ISU Junior Grand Prix in Ukraine (Ukrainian Souvenir) is an international figure skating competition. Sanctioned by the International Skating Union, it is held in the autumn in some years as part of the JGP series. Medals may be awarded in the disciplines of men's singles, ladies' singles, pair skating, and ice dancing.

Junior medalists

Men

Ladies

Pairs

Ice dancing

References

External links 
 International Skating Union
 Ukrainian Figure Skating Federation 

Ukraine
JGP